Blackout is the eighth studio album by the German heavy metal band Scorpions. It was released in 1982 on Harvest Records and Mercury Records.

In the US, the album was certified gold on 24 June 1982 and platinum on 8 March 1984 by RIAA. Rolling Stone ranked Blackout as 73rd on their list of "The 100 Greatest Metal Albums of All Time" in 2017.

Background
After losing his voice during the writing of the album lead singer Klaus Meine had to undergo surgery on his vocal cords and was uncertain as to whether or not he would be able to record. Demos of the material were recorded with singer Don Dokken.  However none of those recordings are featured on the album and Dokken is only credited with backing vocals.

In Kerrang! issue 12, Rudolf Schenker said that he could not choose between his guitar solos on "China White" so the US and European releases differed in this detail. "China White" was used as entrance music for the professional wrestling tag team The Skyscrapers in World Championship Wrestling.

A self-portrait of artist Gottfried Helnwein is featured on the cover of the album. Schenker portrays this character in the "No One Like You" music video.

Track listing

Personnel 
Scorpions
 Klaus Meine – lead vocals
 Rudolf Schenker – rhythm guitars, 6 & 12-string acoustic guitars, lead guitars on tracks 4, 8, 9, backing vocals
 Matthias Jabs – lead guitars, rhythm guitars on tracks 4, 8, 9, 6 & 12-string acoustic guitars, backing vocals
 Francis Buchholz – bass, backing vocals
 Herman Rarebell – drums, backing vocals

Others
 Don Dokken – backing vocals

Production
 Dieter Dierks – producer, engineer
 Gerd Rautenbach – mixing
 Bob Ludwig and Howie Weinberg – mastering at Masterdisk, New York

Charts

Album

Singles

Certifications

References 

1982 albums
Scorpions (band) albums
Harvest Records albums
Mercury Records albums
Albums produced by Dieter Dierks
Glam metal albums